FC Svetlogorsk is a Belarusian football club based in Svetlogorsk, Gomel Voblast.

History
Khimik Svetlogorsk (also previously known as Bumazhnik Svetlogorsk (1971–1972, 1986–1987), Stroitel Svetlogorsk (1973), Burovik Svetlogorsk (1974–1975) and Kommunalnik Svetlogorsk (1997–2000)) is known for being the only club in Belarus that had been playing the Belarusian First League since the first season (1992) without a single promotion or relegation for 30 seasons in a row. The series ended after 2020 season, when the club was disbanded due to financial troubles.

In 2021, a successor team FC Svetlogorsk was established in the Belarusian Second League.

Current squad 
As of September 2022

External links 
 Profile at kick-off.by

Football clubs in Belarus
1971 establishments in Belarus
Association football clubs established in 1971
Association football clubs disestablished in 2020
Association football clubs established in 2021